The Wye Valley Walk is a long distance footpath in Wales and England following the course of the River Wye.

History
In 1975 the Wye Valley Walk opened with a  stretch between St. Arvans and Monmouth. Further stretches were added, leading to it becoming a 34-mile (55 km) footpath by 1981.  During the 1980s, gaps between Ross-on-Wye, Hay-on-Wye and Rhayader were integrated into the pathway, forming a  walk reaching from near the river's mouth at Chepstow in Monmouthshire, to Rhayader in Mid Wales.

The route

The Wye Valley Walk is marked out by circular yellow waymark arrows, finger posts, and signs showing the path's logo, a leaping salmon.  Most of the route follows Public Rights of Way. Some parts are permissive paths where owners have agreed for them to be used.  Parts of Plynlimon are open countryside in which there is a right to roam established by the Countryside and Rights of Way Act 2000.

The route passes through Chepstow, the Wye Valley AONB, Tintern, Monmouth, Ross-on-Wye, Symonds Yat, Hereford, Hay-on-Wye, Builth Wells, Rhayader, and Llangurig to Plynlimon.

The route of the Wye Valley Walk can be broken into 17 stages, though the entire walk is often walked in seven day-length sections from Chepstow to Plynlimon, or vice versa.

Days and sections
Days and sections* described in the text The Wye Valley Walk, and The Wye Valley Walk website, both by The Wye Valley Partnership.

Day 1
Section 1: Chepstow Castle to Tintern Abbey – 
Section 2: Tintern Abbey to Monmouth –

Day 2
Section 1: Monmouth to Symonds Yat – 
Section 2: Symonds Yat to Kerne Bridge – 
Section 3: Kerne Bridge to Ross-on-Wye –

Day 3
Section 1: Ross-on-Wye to Fownhope – 
Section 2: Fownhope to Hereford –

Day 4
Section 1: Hereford to Byford – 
Section 2: Byford to Bredwardine – 
Section 3: Bredwardine to Hay-on-Wye –

Day 5
Section 1: Hay-on-Wye to Glasbury – 
Section 2: Glasbury to Erwood – 
Section 3: Erwood to Builth Wells –

Day 6
Section 1: Builth Wells to Newbridge-on-Wye – 
Section 2: Newbridge-on-Wye to Rhayader –

Day 7
Section 1: Rhayader to Llangurig – 
Section 2: Llangurig to Rhyd-y-benwch (Plynlimon) – 

*miles and km rounded to whole numbers

Landmarks
The Wye Valley Walk passes the following notable landmarks:
 Chepstow Castle
 Tintern Abbey
 Goodrich Castle
 Capler Camp

Rail access
The following stations have services provided by Transport for Wales which can be used to connect with the Wye Valley Walk:

 Chepstow railway station
 Hereford railway station
 Builth Road railway station

References

Recreational walks in Wales
Footpaths in Powys
Long-distance footpaths in the United Kingdom
Tourist attractions in Monmouthshire
Long-distance footpaths in Wales
Long-distance footpaths in England
River Wye
Footpaths in Herefordshire